Manuel Brissaud is a French slalom canoeist who competed in the 1980s and 1990s. He won four medals in the K-1 team event at the ICF Canoe Slalom World Championships with a gold (1991), two silvers (1985, 1993) and a bronze (1987).

References

French male canoeists
Living people
Year of birth missing (living people)
Medalists at the ICF Canoe Slalom World Championships